Carabus victor, is a species of ground beetle in the large genus Carabus. found in Bulgaria.

References 

victor
Insects described in 1836